Gambatis a city and capital of Gambat Tehsil, an administrative subdivision of Khairpur District, located in Sindh province of Pakistan.

References

Populated places in Khairpur District
Talukas of Sindh